Gordon Quinn is Artistic Director and founding member of Kartemquin Films and a 2007 recipient of the MacArthur Award for Creative and Effective Institutions. Gordon Quinn has been making documentaries for over 45 years and has produced or directed over 30 films. His recent directing credits include Prisoner of Her Past and A Good Man. His producing credits include the films Hoop Dreams; In the Family;Vietnam, Long Time Coming; Golub: Late Works Are the Catastrophes; 5 Girls; Refrigerator Mothers; and Stevie.  Most recently, Gordon executive produced Mapping Stem Cell Research: Terra Incognita and The New Americans, for which he directed the Palestinian segment.  Currently, he is executive producing several new films for Kartemquin.
	
Gordon has been a long-time supporter of public media and community-based independent media groups, and served on the boards of several organizations including the National Coalition of Public Broadcast Producers, the Citizens Committee on the Media, the Chicago Access Corporation, the Illinois Humanities Council, the Public Square Advisory Committee and the Illinois Advisory Committee to the U.S. Commission on Civil Rights.

Filmography

Executive Producer:
The Interrupters, in 2011
No Crossover, in 2010
Typeface, in 2009
At the Death House Door, in 2008
Mapping Stem Cell Research: Terra Incognita, 2007
The New Americans, 2004 TV episode
5 Girls, 2001
Hoop Dreams, 1994

Producer:
Prisoner of Her Past, in 2010 (with Joanna Rudnick and Howard Reich)
In the Family, in 2008 (with Joanna Rudnick)
Golub: Late Works Are the Catastrophes, 2004 (with Jerry Blumenthal)
Refrigerator Mothers, 2003 (with JJ Hanley and David E. Simpson)
Stevie, 2002
Vietnam, Long Time Coming, 1998
Chicago Crossings: Bridges and Boundaries, 1994
Higher Goals, 1993
Grassroots Chicago, 1991
Golub, 1988
Taylor Chain, 1985
Women's Voices: The Gender Gap, 1984
The Last Pullman Car, 1983
The Chicago Maternity Center Story, 1976
Marco, 1970 (with Gerald Temaner)
Thumbs Down, 1968
Home for Life, 1968

Director:
A Good Man, in 2011
Prisoner of Her Past, in 2010
Golub: Late Works Are the Catastrophes, 2004
The New Americans, 2004 TV episode (Palestinian story director)
Vietnam, Long Time Coming, 1998
Golub, 1988
Marco, 1970
Thumbs Down, 1968
Home for Life, 1968
Inquiring Nuns, 1968

Cinematographer:
Golub: Late Works Are the Catastrophes, 2004
The New Americans, 2004 TV episode
Aging Out, 2004
Refrigerator Mothers, 2003
Stevie, 2002
Vietnam, Long Time Coming, 1998
Grassroots Chicago, 1991
Golub, 1988
Women's Voices: The Gender Gap, 1984
Taylor Chain II: A Story of Collective Bargaining, 1984
Anarchism in America, 1983
The Last Pullman Car, 1983
All of Us Stronger, 1976
Hum 255, 1969
Thumbs Down, 1968
Home for Life, 1968
Inquiring Nuns, 1968

Editor:
Marco, 1970
Home for Life, 1968
Inquiring Nuns, 1968
Thumbs Down, 1968

Writer:
The Last Pullman Car, 1983

Awards
Excellence in Documentary Cinematography at the Sundance Film Festival for Stevie, 2003

External links

References

Living people
American documentary film producers
Directors Guild of America Award winners
American documentary film directors
1942 births
Film directors from Washington, D.C.